Moresville Range is a range located in the Catskill Mountains of New York west of Grand Gorge. Irish Mountain is located southeast of Moresville Range and McGregor Mountain is located northwest.

References

Mountains of Delaware County, New York
Mountains of New York (state)